The House of Galen is an ancient and influential German noble, Westphalian family, historically Roman Catholic, from the County of Mark.

History
The earliest von Galens appeared in the twelfth century.  Some branches of the family spread to East Prussia through the crusades and military expeditions of the Teutonic Order during the high and late Middle Ages.  The German branches still in existence hold the titles of Freiherr (baron) and Graf (count).

Famous Members
Christoph Bernhard von Galen, prince-bishop of Münster during the Counter-Reformation.
Clemens August Graf von Galen, better known as Clemens August Graf von Galen, German count, Bishop of Münster, and  Cardinal.
Johanna von Galen, German politician.

References

 C. Heitmann: 'Die Familie von Galen.' 3. verb. Auflage, 372 Seiten (2007).
 Genealogisches Handbuch des Adels, Adelslexikon Band IV, Band 67 der Gesamtreihe, C. A. Starke Verlag, Limburg (Lahn) 1978, 

Galen
Münster (region)
Von Galen family
Roman Catholic families